Yevdokimov (Евдокимов), alternatively spelled as Evdokimov (masculine), or Yevdokimova (feminine; Евдокимова) is a Russian surname. Notable people with it include: 

Alexander Ivanovich Yevdokimov (stomatologist) (1883–1979), a Soviet stomatologist and Hero of Socialist Labor.
Alexander Ivanovich Yevdokimov (military officer) (1920–1979), a Soviet army officer and Full Cavalier of the Order of Glory.
Alexander Yevdokimov (1906–1990), a Soviet army officer and Hero of the Soviet Union.
Alexei Yevdokimov (1925–1943),  a Soviet army officer and Hero of the Soviet Union.
Grigory Yevdokimov (1884–1936), a Soviet army officer and Hero of the Soviet Union.
Mikhail Yevdokimov (1957–2005), a Russian entertainer and politician.
Nikolai Yevdokimov (1804–1873), a Russian military commander in Murid War and Russo-Circassian War.
Paul Evdokimov (1901-1970), a Russian and French Orthodox theologian and writer.
Robert Yevdokimov (b. 1970), a Russian professional football coach and a former player.
Vasily Yevdokimov (1898–1941), Soviet general
Vladimir Yevdokimov (b. 1923), a Soviet army officer and Hero of the Soviet Union.
Yefim Yevdokimov (1881–1940), a Soviet politician and member of the Cheka.
Yury Yevdokimov (b. 1946), ex-Governor of Murmansk Oblast.

See also
Evdokimov (crater), lunar crater

Russian-language surnames